Nicolae Mărgineanu (born 25 September 1938) is a Romanian film director and screenwriter. He has directed 15 films since 1978. His 1983 film Return from Hell was entered into the 13th Moscow International Film Festival where it won a Special Diploma. His 1999 film The Famous Paparazzo was entered into the 22nd Moscow International Film Festival.

Selected filmography
 Return from Hell (1983)
 The Forest Woman (1987)
 Flames over Treasures (1988)
 The Famous Paparazzo (1999)
 Bless You, Prison (2002)
 White Gate (2014)
  (2019)

References

External links

1938 births
Living people
Romanian film directors
Romanian screenwriters
Film people from Cluj-Napoca